Helicteres is a genus of flowering plants in the family Malvaceae. Its range is from tropical and sub-tropical Asia through to northern Australia, and also Mexico through to the northern half of South America.

Species
 Plants of the World Online recognises the following 69 species in this genus:

 Helicteres andersonii 
 Helicteres angustifolia 
 Helicteres aspera 
 Helicteres baruensis 
 Helicteres biflexa 
 Helicteres binhthuanensis 
 Helicteres brevispira 
 Helicteres calcicola 
 Helicteres cana 
 Helicteres carthagenensis 
 Helicteres cidii 
 Helicteres corylifolia 
 Helicteres cuneata 
 Helicteres daknongensis 
 Helicteres darwinensis 
 Helicteres denticulenta 
 Helicteres eichleri 
 Helicteres eitenii 
 Helicteres elliptica 
 Helicteres elongata 
 Helicteres flagellaris 
 Helicteres gardneriana 
 Helicteres geoffrayi 
 Helicteres glabriuscula 
 Helicteres guazumifolia 
 Helicteres heptandra 
 Helicteres hirsuta 
 Helicteres integerrima 
 Helicteres integrifolia 
 Helicteres isora 
 Helicteres jamaicensis 
 Helicteres javensis 
 Helicteres kombolgiana 
 Helicteres krapovickasii 
 Helicteres laciniosa 
 Helicteres lanata 
 Helicteres lanceolata 
 Helicteres lenta 
 Helicteres lhotzkyana 
 Helicteres longepedunculata 
 Helicteres macropetala 
 Helicteres macrothrix 
 Helicteres microcarpa 
 Helicteres muscosa 
 Helicteres obtusa 
 Helicteres ovata 
 Helicteres pegueroi 
 Helicteres pentandra 
 Helicteres pilgeri 
 Helicteres pintonis 
 Helicteres plebeia 
 Helicteres poilanei 
 Helicteres procumbens 
 Helicteres prostrata 
 Helicteres rekoi 
 Helicteres rhynchocarpa 
 Helicteres sacarolha 
 Helicteres semiglabra 
 Helicteres semitriloba 
 Helicteres serpens 
 Helicteres sphaerotheca 
 Helicteres tenuipila 
 Helicteres trapezifolia 
 Helicteres urupaensis 
 Helicteres vallsii 
 Helicteres vegae 
 Helicteres velutina 
 Helicteres viscida 
 Helicteres vuarame 

Note: Helicteres apetala Jacq. is a synonym of Sterculia apetala (Jacq.) H.Karst.

Gallery

References

Helicteroideae
Malvaceae genera